Lambdas may refer to:

 Lambda Alpha Upsilon, a nationally selective Latino-interest fraternity based in the United States
 Lambda Theta Phi, a nationally recognized Latin-interest fraternity based in the United States
 Lambda Upsilon Lambda, a nationally recognized Latino-interest fraternity based in the United States
 Lambda Phi Epsilon, a nationally recognized Asian-interest fraternity based in the United States
 Lambda Theta Nu, a nationally recognized Latina based sorority in the United States

See also 
 Lambda (disambiguation)